Bernabé may refer to:

People

As a given name
 Bernabé Ballester (born 1982), Spanish footballer
 Bernabé Barragán (born 1993), Spanish footballer
 Bernabé Cobo, (1582–1657), Spanish Jesuit missionary and writer
 Bernabé Ferreyra (1909–1972), Argentine footballer
 Bernabé Ndaki, Gabonese politician
 Bernabé "Berny" Peña, (born 1980) Costa Rican footballer
 Bernabé Ramos y Miranda, Governor of Melila 1688-1691
 Bernabé Williams also known as Bernie, (born 1968) former Major League Baseball outfielder

As a surname
 Adrián Bernabé (born 2001), Spanish footballer 
 Ángel Bernabé, (born 1987), Spanish footballer
 Franco Bernabè (born 1948), Italian banker 
 Jean Bernabé (1942–2017), Martinican writer and linguist
 Mònica Bernabé (born 1972), Spanish journalist
 Pascal Bernabé, (born 1942) French SCUBA diver

Places
San Bernabé (Monterrey Metro)

See also
Barnabas
Barnaby (disambiguation)
Bernabei (disambiguation)

Spanish masculine given names